Barbara Boardman Smuts is an American anthropologist and psychologist noted for her research into baboons, dolphins, and chimpanzees, and a Professor Emeritus at University of Michigan, Ann Arbor.

Smuts received a bachelor's degree in anthropology from Harvard University and a Ph.D in neurological and biological behavioral science from Stanford Medical School. In the 1970s she began studying animal behaviour at the University of Michigan, including research with Jane Goodall on chimpanzees in Gombe National Park, where she had a violent introduction to field research, being among four field researchers kidnapped and beaten by a Marxist revolutionary group.

Personal life and Education 
Smuts was born to Alice Smuts (1921-2020) and Robert ("Bob") Walter Schmutz (later anglicised to Smuts) in 1950. She has a brother, Robert Malcolm Smuts, born 1949. Smuts moved to Michigan with her family in 1960, and in 1969 to Ann Arbor whilst her mother obtained her Ph.D. She has an undergraduate degree from Harvard University in anthropology, and did her Ph.D. with David Hamburg at Stanford University.

Research
Much of Smuts’ research concerns the development of social relationships between animals, particularly among chimpanzee and baboon populations. Smuts began studies of wild baboons in 1976. Studies she made of wild olive baboons in Tanzania and Kenya inspired her 1985 book Sex and Friendship in Baboons. The book, the fruit of two years' research, showed how two different groups of the same primate interact with each other socially. She determined that friendship was a critical predictor of sexual activity between male and female baboons: females preferred to mate with males that had previously engaged in friendly interactions with them and could interact with their other offspring as well.

Smuts also carried out research into bottlenose dolphin social development, working extensively with Janet Mann.

Smuts' more recent research at the University of Michigan has focused on social behavior among dogs.

Selected publications
Wrangham, R. and Smuts, B. B. (1980). "Sex differences in the behavioural ecology of chimpanzees in the Gombe National Park, Tanzania." Journal of Reproduction and Fertility. Supplement, 28, 13–31.
Smuts, B.B. (2009. First printing 1985) Sex and Friendship in Baboons New York: Aldine Publishing Co. 
Smuts, B.B., Cheney, D.L. Seyfarth, R.M., Wrangham, R.W., & Struhsaker, T.T. (Eds.) (1987). Primate Societies. Chicago: University of Chicago Press.

References

External links

 Barbara Smuts faculty profile at the University of Michigan

Living people
American anthropologists
Women primatologists
Primatologists
Harvard University alumni
Stanford University School of Medicine alumni
University of Michigan faculty
1950 births